Diavlo is a steel roller coaster at Himeji Central Park in Japan which is a clone of Batman: The Ride. It is one of the first Bolliger & Mabillard roller coasters to be located outside of the United States, and the second by launch date; opening four months later than Nemesis at Alton Towers, England.

Roller coasters in Japan
Roller coasters introduced in 1994
Inverted roller coasters manufactured by Bolliger & Mabillard